Hélene Pavlovna Kotchoubey (}, née Bibikova (1812-1888) was a Russian noblewoman and court official.  She served as Ober-Hofmeisterin (Mistress of the Robes) or senior lady-in-waiting to empress Maria Feodorovna (Dagmar of Denmark) in 1881–1888.

Life

She was the daughter of Pavel Gavrilovitj Bibikov (1784–1812) and Elizaveta Andrejevna Bibikova, and was the stepdaughter of Alexander von Benckendorff. She married prince Ėsper Aleksandrovič Belosel'skij-Belozerskij, and secondly in 1847 to prince Vasilij Viktorovitj Kotjubej (1812-1850).

She served as lady-in-waiting before she succeeded Julia Kurakina as senior lady-in-waiting in 1881, and was succeeded by Anna Stroganoff.

References

Ladies-in-waiting from the Russian Empire
1812 births
1888 deaths